The Central City Park Bandstand is a hexagonal bandstand in Central City Park in Macon, Georgia that was built in 1871. It was listed on the National Register of Historic Places on March 16, 1972. The bandstand is located at the eastern terminus of Riverside Drive in Central City Park.

It has been noted to be similar to the top of the iconic octagonal house Longwood (also known as Nutt's Folly) in Natchez, Mississippi.

See also
National Register of Historic Places listings in Bibb County, Georgia

References

Bandstands in the United States
Buildings and structures in Macon, Georgia
Buildings and structures on the National Register of Historic Places in Georgia (U.S. state)
Music venues in Georgia (U.S. state)